Mildred L. Mason Bayer (December 7, 1908 – October 9, 1990) was a Registered Nurse from Ohio who was inducted into the Ohio Women's Hall of Fame for her local and international humanitarian work.

Early life and education 
Mildred Mason was born on December 7, 1908 in Weston, Ohio. Mason earned a nursing degree from St. Vincent Hospital School of Nursing in 1932 in Toledo, Ohio. Bayer was married to Charles Bayer, a physician.

Career 
Bayer founded two clinics in Toledo and Lucas County for migrant farm workers in 1960. Bayer helped establish Mobile Meals in Toledo in 1967, and was the organizations first volunteer coordinator.

In 1970, Bayer began making medical mission trips to Nigeria. Working with the St. Vincent Hospital Grey Nuns, Bayer established a hospital and 23 mobile clinics around Kabba, Nigeria.

In 1984, Bayer founded Health Clinics International (HCI), a non-profit organization based in Toledo, to provide medical care to the homeless and other underserved populations.

Bayer helped pass Ohio state legislation that requires nursing home operators to be licensed.

Recognition 
Bayer received the Outstanding Service Award from the Toledo Educational Association for the Aged and Chronically Ill in 1969.  And Mary Manse College honored her with the Stella Maris Award.

Later life and death 
Bayer died on October 9, 1990.

References 

1908 births
1990 deaths
People from Wood County, Ohio
American nursing administrators
American women nurses
20th-century American women